Trout Lake is an unincorporated community and census-designated place (CDP) in Klickitat County, Washington, United States. The population was 557 at the 2010 census. The town is notable for its organic dairy and herb farms, and as an access point to Mount Adams and the Gifford Pinchot National Forest.

Geography

The community sits in the Trout Lake Valley, drained to the southeast by Trout Lake Creek which flows to the White Salmon River, a south-flowing tributary of the Columbia River.

Climate

Demographics
As of the 2010 United States Census, there were 557 people, 224 households, and 171 families residing in the CDP. The population density was 78.5 people per square mile. There were 290 housing units at an average density of 40.8/sq mi. The racial makeup of the CDP was 92.6% White, 0.2% Black, 0.9% Native American, 0.7% Asian, 2.5% from other races, and 3.1% from two or more races. Hispanic or Latino of any race were 5.2% of the population.

There were 224 households, out of which 28.1% included children under the age of 18, 64.7% included a married husband and wife, 4.0% included a male householder with no wife present, 7.6% had a female householder with no husband present, and 23.7% were non-families. The average household size was 2.46 and the average family size was 2.81.

The demographic spread included 130 (23.3%) under the age of 18, 329 (59.1%) aged 20 to 64, and 85 (15.3%) who were 65 years of age or older. By gender, the population was 51.7% (288) male and 48.3% (269) female. The median age was 44.8 years.

In 2011, the American Community Survey estimated a median income of $31,563 (adjusted for inflation, 2011 dollars) for an individual, and $56,250 for a household.

References

External links
 Trout Lake Community Website

Census-designated places in Klickitat County, Washington
Census-designated places in Washington (state)
Mount Adams (Washington)
Gifford Pinchot National Forest